Ornipholidotos nancy is a butterfly in the family Lycaenidae. It is found in the Republic of the Congo where it mainly resides in forests.

Adults have been recorded on wing in October and January.

References

Butterflies described in 2000
Ornipholidotos
Endemic fauna of the Republic of the Congo
Butterflies of Africa